The Dallol Bosso (Zarma: Boboye) is one of two major seasonal river valleys in southwest Niger. The Dallol Bosso valley runs from the Azawagh area in the Sahara west and south through the Dosso Region where it reaches the Niger River valley.

Human habitation
Dallol is the Djerma language equivalent of the Arabic Wadi or the Hausa Kori: an ancient river valley which carries surface water in the rainy season, but maintains subsurface water at other times, making it a magnet for human habitation. It has historically been a center of the Djerma people of Niger. Its sections are known by a number of local names, including Dallol Boboy near its mouth and Dallol Azawak in its northern sections.

Course
The valley spreads out as the Azawagh depression on the western shadow of the Aïr Mountains, contracting and feeding a handful of valleys which once carried ancient tributaries of the Niger. Its western escarpment runs along a geological fault near where it reaches the Niger.

References

Landforms of Niger
Dosso Region
Ramsar sites in Niger
Sahel